Musa basjoo, known variously as Japanese banana, Japanese fibre banana or hardy banana, is a species of flowering plant belonging to the banana family Musaceae. It was previously thought to have originated in the Ryukyu islands of southern Japan, from where it was first described in cultivation, but is now known to have originated in subtropical southern China, where it is also widely cultivated, with wild populations found in Sichuan province.

Description

Uses

Cultivation
Musa basjoo has been cultivated both for its fibre and as an ornamental plant in gardens outside its natural range, first in Japan, and from the late 19th century, then in the warmer parts of western Europe (north of the United Kingdom), the United States, and southern Canada. In gardens, it is used as a hardy 'tropical foliage' plant. If the pseudostem is killed, the banana will resprout from the ground where it rapidly grows to full size in a season under optimal conditions. Thus, it can be grown as far north as USDA zone 6a. It can also be overwintered under cover in a pot and kept growing, which is the only way it can be made to fruit in northern regions as it requires 12–24 months of warmth to bloom. 

In the UK, it has gained the Royal Horticultural Society's Award of Garden Merit.

Fibre
These are beaten, bleached and dried to produce the raw material, which can then be made into products like hand-knotted carpets, tablecloths, kimono and paper. Outside Japan, Manila hemp is obtained from related plant Musa textilis, whose unbleached fibres are used for high-strength rope.

Traditional medicine
In traditional Chinese medicine, the stem, flower, leaves and rhizome of Musa basjoo are considered useful for clearing heat-toxins, quenching thirst and disinhibiting urine.

Culture
The 17th-century Japanese poet Matsuo Bashō took his pen name from this plant.

Notes

References

External links

 Musa basjoo Sieb. et Zucc. Medicinal Plant Images Database (School of Chinese Medicine, Hong Kong Baptist University)  

basjoo
Fiber plants
Flora of China
Flora of the Ryukyu Islands
Crops originating from China
Garden plants of Asia